Andrea Wilson (born 5 December 1985) is an Australian professional basketball player who plays for the Bendigo Spirit in the Women's National Basketball League.

Professional career

WNBL
Wilson made her professional debut with the Spirit in 2007. She has since been a strong, consistent member of the Spirit roster. With the Spirit, she has won two Championships in 2013 and 2014, led by the likes of Kristi Harrower, Gabrielle Richards and her sister, Kelly Wilson. Wilson has been re-signed for the 2016–17 season.

Personal life
Wilson's older sister, Kelly, born eleven months earlier than Andrea, is also a professional basketball player. They spent several seasons together at the Bendigo Spirit.

References

1985 births
Living people
Australian women's basketball players
Guards (basketball)